Nantucket is the debut release by North Carolina music group, Nantucket. It includes the hit single "Heartbreaker", which helped this album make the Billboard charts and sell around 200,000 copies.  Other featured songs include "She's No Good", "Born in a Honky Tonk", "Girl, You Blew a Good Thing" and "Quite Like You".  Norton Buffalo from the Steve Miller Band has a harp (harmonica) solo on the song "Never Gonna Take Your Lies". Nantucket was released on compact disc by re-issue label Wounded Bird Records in 2003.

Track listing
"Heartbreaker" (Redd) – 3:53
"Never Gonna Take Your Lies" (Redd) – 3:49
"Real Romance" (Redd) – 4:08
"She's No Good" (Redd) – 3:27
"Born in a Honky Tonk" (Redd) – 3:21
"It's Gettin' Harder" (Redd) – 3:34
"Girl, You Blew a Good Thing" (Redd) – 3:30
"Spring Fever" (Redd) – 4:45
"Quite Like You" (Redd) – 2:29
"What's the Matter with Loving You" (Redd) – 3:24

Personnel
 Tommy Redd – lead and rhythm guitars, acoustic guitar, lead and background vocals
 Larry Uzzell – lead and background vocals, bass guitar, trumpet, harp, congas, percussion
 Mike Uzzell – Moog bass, various keyboards, lead and background vocals
 Eddie Blair – saxophones, keyboards, percussion, background vocals
 Kenny Soule – drums and percussion
 Mark Downing – lead, slide and acoustic guitars

Additional musician
 Norton Buffalo – harp solo on "Never Gonna Take Your Lies"

References

 AllMusic. [ Nantucket: Credits]. Retrieved April 21, 2007.
 The Daily Reflector. Nantucket: Credits. Retrieved April 21, 2007.

External links
 [ Nantucket on Allmusic]
 Unofficial Nantucket Fansite

1978 debut albums
Nantucket (band) albums
Epic Records albums